Woodmont is a neighborhood in northwest Washington, D.C.

Geography 

The neighborhood is generally agreed to be bounded by Chevy Chase (Washington, D.C.) to the Northwest, Rock Creek Park to the East, Forest Hills (Washington, D.C.) to the South, and barely touches Wakefield, Washington, D.C. at the very bottom. It starts at Nebraska Avenue and ends at Rock Creek Park at Utah Avenue. Opinions differ on the southern boundary, where Woodmont meets Forest Hills, but many residents consider it to be Broad Branch Road between 32nd and 27th streets. The major roads include Military Road and Nebraska Avenue, though some do not consider the border to be part of the neighborhood. The area is served by the M4, E2, and E4 Metrobus lines, and D31, D32, D34, and W45 during school hours. Woodmont is within walking distance of three Red Line stations: Van Ness-UDC, Tenleytown-AU, and Friendship Heights. The public schools that serve Woodmont are Lafayette Elementary, Ben W. Murch Elementary, Alice Deal Middle School, and Woodrow Wilson High School (Washington, D.C.). Woodmont also contains Francis G. Newlands Park, better known as Little Forest.

History 
The founding of this neighborhood is mostly the same as Chevy Chase (Washington, D.C.) until they seceded to form their own community. This area of what used to be Chevy Chase felt separate enough to create its own neighborhood. There are many socioeconomic differences between the residents of Woodmont and Chevy Chase. This is why in 2016, residents of the area decided to create Woodmont, a neighborhood where the people feel connected.

Education 
Only one school is actually located in Woodmont D.C., which is St. John's College High School, a private Catholic High School, though many residents attend Lafayette Elementary, Ben W. Murch Elementary, Alice Deal Middle School, and  Woodrow Wilson High School (Washington, D.C.), as well as other various private and charter schools.

Neighborhoods in Northwest (Washington, D.C.)